The year 704 BC was a year of the pre-Julian Roman calendar. In the Roman Empire, it was known as year 50 Ab urbe condita . The denomination 704 BC for this year has been used since the early medieval period, when the Anno Domini calendar era became the prevalent method in Europe for naming years.

Events

 Sennacherib moves the Assyrian capital to Nineveh.

Births

Deaths
Duke Xian of Qin (725–704 BC)

References

700s BC